The Monégasque Athletics Federation (French Fédération monégasque d'athlétisme) is the governing body for the sport of athletics in Monaco.

Affiliations 
International Association of Athletics Federations (IAAF)
European Athletic Association (EAA)
Comité Olympique Monégasque

National records 
FMA maintains the Monégasque records in athletics.

External links 
Official webpage 

Monaco
Athletics
National governing bodies for athletics